The Party of Unity and Development (PUD) is a political party in Mauritania led by Mohamed Baro.

History
The party won three seats in the 2013 parliamentary elections.

References

Political parties in Mauritania